The following lists events that happened during 1954 in Singapore.

Incumbents
 Governor: Sir John Fearns Nicoll
 Colonial Secretary: Sir Wiiliam Goode

Events

February
 22 February - Rendel Commission's recommendations were unveiled to the public. It proposed changes to the constitution, which took effect on 8 February 1955.

May
 13 May - The National Service riots took place in Singapore after a peaceful demonstration turned violent.

August
 21 August - The Singapore Labour Front (LF) was founded.

October
 27 October - Singapore Polytechnic was founded as the first polytechnic in Singapore.

November
 21 November - The People's Action Party (PAP) was founded.

Births
 6 January - Ong Keng Yong, diplomat.
 9 April - Lim Hng Kiang, former politician.
 9 May - Ho Peng Kee, legal academic and former politician.
 13 July - Lim Swee Say, former politician.
 23 August - Halimah Yacob, President of Singapore.
 13 September - George Yeo, former politician.
 22 September - Marcus Chin, actor.
 27 December - Teo Chee Hean, Senior Minister of Singapore.

See also
List of years in Singapore

References

 
Singapore
Years in Singapore